Fillmore Municipal Airport  is a city-owned public-use airport located two nautical miles (4 km) west of the central business district of Fillmore, a city in Millard County, Utah, United States.

Although most U.S. airports use the same three-letter location identifier for the FAA and IATA, this airport is assigned FOM by the FAA and FIL by IATA (which assigned FOM to Foumban Airport in Foumban, Cameroon).

Facilities and aircraft 
It has one asphalt paved runway designated 4/22 which measures 5,040 by 75 feet (1,536 x 23 m). For the 12-month period ending December 31, 2006, the airport had 1,787 aircraft operations, an average of 148 per month: 98% general aviation and 2% air taxi.

References

External links 
 

Airports in Utah
Buildings and structures in Millard County, Utah
Transportation in Millard County, Utah